Elizabeth Locks & Dam is one of nine navigational structures on the Monongahela River between Pittsburgh, Pennsylvania and Fairmont, West Virginia. Maintained and built by the U.S. Army Corps of Engineers, the gated dam forms an upstream pool that extends for 23.8 miles, stretching to Charleroi, Pennsylvania.

The dam is located at mile 23.8 of the Monongahela River; it was modernized during a major reconstruction project in 1979-80.

See also
List of crossings of the Monongahela River

References

Buildings and structures in Allegheny County, Pennsylvania
Monongahela River
United States Army Corps of Engineers, Pittsburgh District
Dams in Pennsylvania
Water transportation in Pennsylvania
United States Army Corps of Engineers dams
Dams completed in 1907
Transportation buildings and structures in Allegheny County, Pennsylvania